Jim Parsons is an American gasser drag racer.

He drove a 1927 Ford dubbed The High and Mighty; in 1963, it was powered by a Dodge V8, in 1966 by a Chrysler.

Parsons won the NHRA A/SR (A Street) national title twice, in 1963 and 1966.

Notes

Sources
Davis, Larry. Gasser Wars, North Branch, MN:  Cartech, 2003, pp.180-8.</ref>  

 

Dragster drivers
American racing drivers